Odites nubeculosa is a moth in the family Depressariidae. It was described by Edward Meyrick in 1918. It is found in South Africa.

The wingspan is about 26 mm. The forewings are fuscous whitish, with irregularly scattered with dark fuscous specks except towards the costa. The discal stigmata are black, with a cloudy fuscous spot beneath and slightly beyond the second. There are cloudy dots of suffused dark fuscous scales along the termen. The hindwings are whitish.

References

Endemic moths of South Africa
Moths described in 1918
Odites
Taxa named by Edward Meyrick